Enayati may refer to:
 Enayati-ye Bala
 Enayati-ye Pain
 Enayati-ye Vasat